is a 1991 anime television series, created by Takara and Sunrise under the direction of Katsuyoshi Yatabe. It is the second incarnation in the long-running "Brave", (or Yūsha), franchise. This series's title's English translation bears "Fighter" after "Brave" (therefore Brave "Fighter" of the Sun) on the Japanese DVD box art.

Story
In 2010, an evil energy being who names himself Drias comes to Earth, joining forces with Dr. Jango, a wicked scientist, in secrecy to bring ruin to the world - the  follows him to Earth and their members put their energy-formed spirits into either the special android vehicles built by Japan's scientist Hiroshi Amano (which have transformable bodies and were intended to be rescue units) or different service vehicles like an ambulance, a police car or a firefighter truck, all for the purpose of both concealing themselves from the eyes and ears of civilians and granting themselves matter-formed appearances for the feeling and touching of substances without their energies passing through such as ground or walls. Their commander, Fighbird, uses a human-shaped android created by Dr. Amano to enhance his invisibility from unintended eyes and ears and from then on lives as his artificial human-flesh-created android disguise Yutaro Katori. He transforms from his human identity when serious trouble strikes, and in the meantime he tries to adapt himself to living with Dr. Amano and his grandchildren Kenta and Haruka so he can interact with humans, learn more about Earth itself and put a stop to Drias' and Jango's plans for Earth and the Universe itself.

Characters
  Yutaro Katori is the artificial human flesh-coated and artificial human blood-powered android form that Fighbird takes, after merging his soul with an android that Dr. Hiroshi Amano created to handle his world peace machines and also takes his human appearance from a drawing made by Dr. Amano's granddaughter Haruka - his artificial skin is made of super silicone foam that disappears when revealing himself in line with the mechanics of his transformation, and artificial blood flows through his body (because he looks to hide himself as an artificial human in everyday life to boost his discrete learning of human life while also needing a mater-formed true identity appearance, he channels some of his people's natural properties into Fire Jet to recreate it as the disguised transforming body of his true identity). Under his Katori disguise, he publicly poses as Amano's assistant: he tends to make irrelevant, comical remarks because he does not know Earth well, and sometimes gets himself in trouble due to his extreme naivete about human interactions. His kind nature often gains him friends, however, and he's also ferociously protective of his loved ones and of Earth itself. His true identity is Fighbird before later he also becomes an alternative true guise for space-based situations that his actual identity is not capable of: Granbird, and then reengineers both of his true identities so that his true bodies may combine into a final enhancement combination transformation for his first true alias, Fighbird: Great Fighbird, and has the ability of instinctively learning how to handle any kind of technology with next-to-no training, from simple vehicles to whole computer systems. He is played by Yasunori Matsumoto.
  As the 65-year-old head of the Amano Peace Science Laboratory, he develops machines to achieve world peace. They always fail, but he learns from this failure and often saves the day, especially after the vehicles he designed and built 'host' the souls of some of Fighbird's Space Police teammates (namely, the Baron Team). He has financial problems with the land he lives on and is also considered an eccentric by neighboring inhabitants and fellow scientists, leading him to be a bit of a glory hound. He is voiced by Ichirō Nagai.
  Doctor Amano's cheerful, hotblooded grandson, and the first friend that Katori makes after his arrival to Earth. He acts with Katori as an earth special member of the Space Police Force, helping him in battle and keeping links between him and the Rescue base; he thinks of Katori as an elder brother, calling him "big brother Katori". He is voiced by Kazue Ikura.
  Kenta's cousin and Doctor Amano's sweet and mature granddaughter, who lives with Dr. Amano because her parents work abroads. Since her grandpa is inventing all the time, she has trouble doing chores. She also has to keep Kenta in line at times. She created the picture that inspired Katori's human appearance, and has a precocious crush on him. She is voiced by Rie Iwatsubo.
  Haruka's small pet monkey, apparently a gift from her parents. Voiced by Kazue Ikura.
  A beautiful and kind doctor who works at a local hospital. She doubts Katori's identity ever since he tried to donate his artificial blood and she noticed strange things in its sample, but couldn't fully analyze it due to Katori and Kenta taking it away. As time passes, she both learns about the Universe Security Team's mission against Draias and develops romantic feelings for Katori. Unbeknownst to Yoshiko, her ambulance hosts the soul of someone from the Guard Team, more specifically Guard Rescue. She is voiced by Masako Katsuki.
  A detective of the Tokyo Metropolitan Police Department, who uses tactics that have much to be desired (and often backfire on him), and firmly thinks Dr. Amano is linked to a huge robbery that took place three years ago. Nevertheless, he displays noticeable courage and will to help people when the situation calls for it. Satsuda is unaware that his own police car is also inhabited by the soul of a Space Police Force member, this time Guard Star; as such, he often can't find his car when he needs it. He was voiced by Shigezō Sasaoka.
  A plucky and hotheaded TV reporter who constantly goes for the big scoop. She tries to get as close to Fighbird's battles as possible, only to often be put in danger as a result. Momoko develops a crush on Fighbird after he saves her for the first time, calling him "her prince", and will often hound Kenta for answers as to his identity. She cannot recognize him as Katori, however, despite thinking that she knows him from somewhere. She is voiced by Chie Kojiro.

Universe Security Team

Fighbird
: The  of Fighbird and Granbird. For this form, if Fighbird is in either his or his alternative body Granbird's Armament Combinations, those combined forms must be disassembled. Granbird/Fire Shuttle splits apart in the style of most of Granbird forming one single piece and the legs simply forming the lower legs of this combination. The legs form over Fighbird's lower legs (this requires Fighbird's feet folding down) while Granbird's torso splits in half as the arms with Granbird's arms, while transformed back into Fire Shuttle's weapons, forming shoulder-mounted firing weapons and a special back-plate that joins the two halves together forming a new chest completed with the wings becoming a part of that torso. Fighbird's arms, facing down, close together over Fighbird's torso so that Granbird's torso, forming the arms of Great Fighbird, can lock over the sides that join Fighbird's arms and torso together with Granbird's back and wings forming over the arms of Fighbird and the head of Granbird being used as the head of Great Fighbird via the back of the head doubling as the face and a "crest" appearing on the top of Granbird's head's back (now the forehead of Great Fighbird) when this combination is formed.
Fighbird: The true identity of Katori when he reunites his life-force with his true body, disguised as Fire Jet. Additionally, Fighbird also has an  formed by combining with the body's auxiliary mecha, Flame Breaster.
  One half of Fighbird's disguised form - for this half, Fighbird's body is disguised as a jet that Dr. Amano built while his life-force uses the android body known as Katori to lead life while his true identity is kept constantly hidden.
  The futuristic fighter-jet-like auxiliary mecha of Fighbird's true identity - this mecha has a  equipped to either side of its rear section; such two cannons, when Fighbird has executed Armament Combination with Flame Breaster, fold away to the back when not in use.
: A replacement true identity that Fighbird takes on by using Fire Shuttle as a body while his original true body, Fire Jet, either has been damaged to an unusable extent or is not able to match a certain situation. Additionally, Granbird also has a  - for this combination, Breaster Jet, like Fighbird's auxiliary mecha Flame Breaster, would with its Armament Combination with Fighbird, combines with Granbird in the style of attaching completely onto the torso's front section with a helmet folding down and its six-missile Gran Rocketer launchers folding away onto the back when not yet in use by this combination for an attack.
  The disguised form of Fighbird's alternative true identity's body.
  The futuristic-themed auxiliary mecha of Fighbird's second true identity, Granbird - this mecha is equipped with a six-missile  launcher on either side at its rear section, equipped to the left and right

This team bears an emergency theme as their disguise forms represent mostly Earth's three public civil service occupations: police for Guard Star, fire-fighting for Guard Fire and medical-related situations for Guard Rescue. Additionally, this team's first three members have a back-mounted pack that allows them to "Met On" when an eye-visor-only helmet flips out - these helmets are useful for purposes such as scans.
: (Voiced by Kōji Totani) The  of Guar Star, Guard Fire, Guard Rescue and Guard Wing - Guardion has now acquired both a special enhanced form via a fourth member of the Guard Team joining the formation and, due to Guard Wing's disguise transformation being an aircraft vehicle, flight benefits.
: (Voiced by Naoki Bandō) The  of the Guard Team's first three members, Guard Star, Fire, and Rescue - this combination is simply a basic combination before Guard Wing's joining of the formation provides a boost in abilities.
: (Voiced by Naoki Bandō) Leader of the Guard Team. He disguises himself as the police car owned by Inspector Satsuda. Forms the head, chest and back of Guardion.
: (Voiced by Naoki Makishima) He disguises himself as a fire truck. Forms the arms and a special under-torso sectionof Guardion where Guard Star forms most of the torso with this under-torso section allowing Guard Star to finish the torso's assembly.
: (Voiced by Kōji Tsujitani) He disguises himself as the ambulance belonging to Dr. Kunieda's workplace. Forms the legs of Guardion.
: (Voiced by Kōji Totani) He disguises himself as a twin-gyro plane. His body forms the extension-like feet of Super Guardion, forming over Guardion's feet with his wings forming onto the back of Guardion's arm-to-shoulder sections and his back, after his chest-plate design attaches back onto this piece, forming a torso-sized armor plate, with Guardion's head being replaced by a larger head. He joins the cast halfway in the series and has a hot-headed, proud personality that causes him and his companions may problems.

A five-piece team. All of the Barons except Ace are not fully sentient, acting as if they are actually partially sentient non-voiced sub-ordinates.
: (Voiced by Kōzō Shioya) The  of the Baron Team. Furthermore, each member is "numbered" with a number appearing somewhere on their bodies (Most of the time the chest).
: (Voiced by Kōzō Shioya) Leader of the Baron Team. He disguises himself a tank and directs Barons 2 through 5. Forms the torso, head and upper legs of Thunder Baron with Ace Baron's tank disguise's firing weapons, which act as forearm-mounted firearms for the humanoid form of Ace Baron, relocating to the shoulders.
  Disguises as a trailer. Forms the right arm of Thunder Baron.
  Disguises as a drill tank. Forms the left arm of Thunder Baron.
  Disguises as a submarine. Forms the right leg of Thunder Baron.
  Disguises as a small jet. Forms the left leg of Thunder Baron.

A special team attack formation formed when Thunder Baron switches into Thunder Jet (and Drill Baron's drill's tip section disappears to reveal a firing barrel) and links up with Super Guardion (Super Guardion's "G" chest-plate opens to reveal two connectors that link up to Thunder Jet's thrusters while he punches his fists into Thunder Jet's other thrusters) and then Great Fighbird's Great Cannons link up to Super Guardion's shoulders. When the Team is ready to fire, the driver's seat section of Road Baron's disguise form raises up for use by Great Fighbird as a trigger and targeting scope.

Antagonists
Drias
The series' head antagonist,  (Portrayed by Daisuke Gori) joins forces with Dr. Jango while on Earth to catapult the world into darkness. He refers to himself as bearing the title of  because of his supremacy. For a transformation, he possess two forms: 
  For this beast form transformation, he transforms in a divide-and-conquer fashion into three named alternate identities (which each serve as 1/3 of the body):
  The head, chest, back (and therefore the accompanying wings), shin guards and feet.
  The right torso half, arm and leg with two back-mounted  each relocating onto a shoulder when Drias changes from his Death Team guise.
  The left torso half, arm and leg with the wings becoming a  that acts efficiently as the sheath for Drias' 
...Before he reforms his body through . The character's name is likely derived from a portmanteau spelling of "tri" (meaning "three") with "death" ("T" from "tri" is replaced by "D" from "death") - this is a reference to his Death Team transformation's mechanics of being 3 thirds of a true identity.
  A vehicle form for transportation.
Furthermore, Drias, during the series' finale, assumes a special "organic"-themed  transformation after he bathes himself in all of the negative energy from deep space using the Devil Tower. While in this form his powers include armored skin that can regenerate while in the dark field, four energy-draining tentacles from each arm, flight, eye fireballs, morphing his right hand into a long spear, green winds from the left palm that can spawn fire, a red mouth spear that can be converted into a powerful fireball, purple energy saw discs and red explosive energy blasts from around his body.
  A wicked mad scientist, Dr. Amano's biggest rival and Drias' ally. He built his base at the bottom of the sea and often finds himself in trouble since Zol and Shura, whose wicked souls each inhabit two androids that he built, refuse to follow his leads. He secretly plans to gather enough power to overthrow Draias. He is played by Junpei Takiguchi.
 and   Drias' muscular and lanky, respectively, assistants who carry out his orders directly and tend to ignore Jango's plans. They command Drias' machine gun-wielding Teshita henchmen and his monsters, the Mecha Beasts. They are played by Kiyoyuki Yanada and Yu Shimaka, respectively.
: Literally translated as "Follower", these human-sized robots created by Dr. Jango are for basic labor and serve as infantry. They are armed with either a machine gun or flamethrower and can have a sub-machine gun replace either hand. They are also built to swim long distances and have Kevlar-like armor, although concentrated ultraviolet radiation such as sunlight can easily damage their circuitry.

Mecha Beasts
Mecha Beasts serve as the monsters of the week of the series. These mechanical entities are designed by Dr. Jango in his underwater base in the Pacific Ocean while being powered by Drias' minus energy. They are often piloted by Zol, Shura or both, although Jango has piloted a few himself. Mecha Beasts usually disguise themselves as objects for stealth to prevent instant discovery.

Sand Tremor: Appears in episode 1. Powers include burrowing, launchable centipede legs on cables and a mouth flamethrower. Reappears in the Famicom adaption game without its legs being launchable and under the name Sand Pedron.
Frabirah: Appears in episode 2. Powers include swimming, giant lobster claws armed with purple beams, separating its body's manta-ray-like section named Shigurabu (this leads to 2 different duties being performed simultaneously) armed with red beams from the wings and abdomen missiles.
Benmabent: Appears in episode 3. Powers include emitting CFCs absorbed from its tentacles, treads and purple mouth acid.
Mantisor: Appears in episode 4. Powers include flight and dual shoulder energy cannons.
Sukeagan: Appears in episode 4. Its only known power is a large extendable drill for the right arm.
Gurobil: Appears in episode 5. Powers include swimming, strong jaws, coiling, resisting underwater pressure as deep as 7300 meters, mouth torpedoes and a pink energy cannon on each head side.
Go Top: Appears in episode 6: Powers include emitting strong winds and red lasers from its top-like body, levitation and three wired grappling hooks.
Sutangia: Appears in episode 7: Powers include leg treads, a red laser from the head strong enough to obliterate mountains and yellow lasers from both the right hand pincer claw and torso.
Dabias: Appears in episode 8. Powers include a saucer mode armed with three purple lasers from the underside, flight, explosive yellow lasers from the head, bladed claw hands and energy resistance.
Barbus: Appears in episode 9. Powers include flight, mouth-spewed pink "GP Liquid" acid, an underside tractor beam, a tail laser and a machine gun in each wing. Dr. Jango calls it the "Mechadragonfly" in the episode shortly after its destruction. Reappears in the Famicom adaption game with only its GP Liquid spewing ability and under the name Dragon.
Vice Kid: Appears in episode 10. Powers include burrowing, a red laser cannon from the head, three lesser red laser cannons on the underside and high jumping.
Bekusa: Appears in episode 11. Powers include burrowing, toxic spores from the back, using the launchable spikes on its back for emitting electric bolts, giving it long-range teleportation in a blinding light, and firing electric balls, a pair of green laser cannons on the neck's back and a mouth flamethrower.
Beinbul: Appears in episode 12. Powers include swimming, emitting red tide algae and white acid from the mouth and pincer claw hands on its four arms. Reappears in the Famicom adaption game with different powers and under the name Shired-Tide
Parasite: Appears in episode 13. Powers include disguising itself as a Mayan temple, eighteen yellow energy cannons, and purple glue from the mouth.
Dorauta: Appears in episode 14. Powers include a turbine for spawning tornadoes and levitating, burrowing, retractable limbs, a green laser cannon on each shoulder and a head-equipped flamethrower.
Destroid: Appears in episode 15. Powers include swimming, a global magnetic field, pincer claws tentacles armed with red lasers, six homing torpedo launchers, and a red energy beam from the underside.
Growler: Appears in episode 16. Powers include swimming and a jackhammer for each arm armed with a launchable spear.
Skull Bites: Appears in episode 17. Powers include four mouth guns and meat hook arms.
Mouru Toad: Appears in episode 18. Powers include burrowing, emitting structure acid from the holes on its body, energy cutters from the pupils, a long sticky tongue armed, yellow mouth lasers, high jumping and finger spikes.
Diabolada: Appears in episode 19. Powers include flight and tooth missiles.
Insulabor: Appears in episode 21. Powers include flight, green lasers from the mouth, an energy cannon for the upper left arm and a pair of extendable tentacles for the lower arms.
Flygan: Appears in episode 21. Powers include lasers beams from its gun-like mouth and capture rings.
Terra Grant: Appears in episode 22. Powers include disguising itself as a cargo plane, six grapple arms, a 36-tube bomb launcher on each side of its body, a 28-tube bomb launcher in the front center of its body, a 12-tube bomb launcher along the top of its front, a 7-tube bomb launcher on each upper corner, levitation, and a red large bladed claw.
Goljira: Appears in episode 23. Powers include flight, burrowing and mouth suction.
Decashita: Appears in episode 23. Powers include division into construction robots with a pair of lanterns and flight.
Irushida: Appears in episode 24. Powers include the growth of devil flowers around it, flight, six extendable electric tentacles, an explosive pink laser from each of its six peddles, a saucer mode, and a fan in the center of its body.
Inamasu: Appears in episode 25. Powers include burrowing, blue energy balls from its elephant trunk, a pair of elephant tusks for goring and firing red energy balls, and flight.
Dazzler: Appears in episode 26. Powers include flight, pectoral tractor beams, red claw beams, and devil stone energy from the forehead.
Drotasu: Appears in episode 28. Powers include creating cold weather by redirecting snow, burrowing, reflective ice armor, green eye bolts, an ice cannon on the back, a circular saw in each shoulder, freezing breath, and flight by head and limb retraction to execute a spin attack. Dr. Jango refers to snow re-director as the Super Freezer.
Griper: Appears in episode 29. Powers include flight, launchable fists on cables that emit red electricity, and a railgun on each shoulder. It heavily resembles Zeong from the original Mobile Suit Gundam and Barzam from Mobile Suit Zeta Gundam.
Sabeja: Appears in episode 30. Powers include a rhino horn and a 7-tube missile pod on each front hip.
Giros: Appears in episode 31. Powers include flight, tank treads, a large drill, and a machine gun in each eye.
Mass Jiva: Appears in episode 32. Powers include flight, large claws, electric bolts from the bridge, a pair of 9-tube missile launchers in the bow, and three energy cannons on the bridge.
Hercas: Appears in episode 33. Powers include flight, a mouth tractor beam, and a club.
Fly Doll: Appears in episode 34. Powers include capture bubbles, a vacuum in the abdomen, a pair of machine guns on the rear end, mouth flames, a bow stored in the back armed with explosive cluster arrows, flight, and waist machine guns.
Pipokibu: Appears in episode 35. Powers include flight, four energy cannon legs, a pair of missile pods in the back, and a pink suction beam from the mouth.
Stain Bat: Appears in episode 36. Powers include flight, mouth sonic waves, fangs, and a machine gun on each wing.
Anomeras: Appears in episode 37. Powers include swimming, electric squid tentacles, and three machine guns on each side of its nautilus shell.
Minus Energized Gorilla: Appears in episode 38. Powers include swimming and strength. It is a regular gorilla mutated with Draias's minus energy.
Impairer: Appears in episode 39. Powers include an ultrasonic hypnosis eye that causes muscle stiffness, burrowing, treads, claw arms, four green laser guns in each side of the head, a high-strength coating gun on its top, and a pair of double-barreled green laser turrets on each side of the coating gun.
Toransanto: Appears in episode 40. Powers include dividing into three robots, three pink energy cannons, and foot wheels.
Plainmanto: Appears in episode 41. Powers include flight, projectile-resistant bladed mantis arms, mouth missiles, extendable knee blades, red eye beams, and a pair of blades from the back.
Jinmen: Appears in episode 42. Powers include burrowing, a pair of scythe-like claw arms, a pair of electric restraining tentacles in the face, and a pink laser cannon on each shoulder.
Garbaji: Appears in episode 43. Powers include green explosive lasers from the fingers, shoulder cannons that fire capsules of poisonous gas composed of chlorine and carbon monoxide, fan blades in the waist, and heat-resistant hands.
Epidemia: Appears in episode 44. Powers include a blimp disguise, emitting a biological contagion that resembles black snow, flight, bladed boomerang antlers, a drill arm, a chainsaw arm, and an electric capture gun.
Medosoid: Appears in episode 45. Powers include swimming, eight extendable octopus tentacles, and purple energy beams from the underside.
Sodom and Gomorrah Combination: Appears in episode 48. Powers include flight and strength. This Mecha Beast is the combination of 2 Mecha Beasts that both appear in the same episodes each, are the last piloted Mecha Beast used each and use the same powers/abilities:
Flight
Strength
Yellow energy from each side of the torso and knuckles
The components of this combination both appear in numbers 46 through 48:
Sodom: The last mecha beast used by Shura.
Gomorrah: The last mecha beast used by Zol.

Video games
A vertical rail shooter based on the series was released on the Famicom in 1991 with a Game Boy version released the next year. The game featured primarily enemy tanks, VTOLs, submarines, and sea monsters with a few mecha monsters from the series serving as bosses under different names. The game was mistranslated in English as Fire Bird. Draias in his normal form appears as the final boss under the title Dark Fire Bird. In the Game Boy version, Draias can divide himself into his three beast forms.

Fighbird later returns in the Brave Saga games with Sodom, Gomorrah and Draias serving as the only villainous entities in the series to appear and are used in several levels instead of just the final battle; the Death Team, Draias Jet, and Organic Draias do not appear. It is also noted that Fighbird is the only series other than Brave Command Dagwon not to have any storyline or villains in Brave Saga 2. Fighbird also stars in the Harobots games alongside many other anime robots including the Brave series.

Internet meme

In 2011, a scene from episode 3 in which Fighbird, as his Katori disguise, sees a butterfly while speaking to Inspector Satsuda and asks "is this a pigeon?" was uploaded to Tumblr, spawning many variations and becoming a popular meme which had a resurgence in 2018.

References

External links
 

Fighbird (Famicom version) GameFaqs page
Fighbird (Game Boy version) GameFaqs page

1991 anime television series debuts
Sunrise (company)
Tatsunoko Production
Super robot anime and manga
Brave series
Film and television memes
Internet memes